Abchanchu is a legendary Bolivian vampire who shapeshifts into the form of a helpless, elderly traveler. When a passerby offers to help him, Abchanchu victimizes him and drinks his blood.

References

Mythological hematophages
Shapeshifting
Indigenous Andean legendary creatures